University Hall is a white granite building designed by the great early American architect Charles Bulfinch and built by the noted early engineer Loammi Baldwin, Jr. It is located in Harvard Yard on the campus of Harvard University in Cambridge, Massachusetts. It was designated a National Historic Landmark in 1970 for its architectural significance.

The hall was designed by Bulfinch, class of 1781, and built between 1813–1815 of white Chelmsford granite, probably using rock cut to size at the Charlestown Prison. It consists of a partial basement story, plus three full stories raised above ground as well as an additional story set within the roofline. The long east and west facades are very similar, and symmetrically arranged with two entrances per facade, each flanked by pilasters; smaller north and south facades present rows of windows. Total construction cost was $65,000 of which $53,000 was paid by the Commonwealth of Massachusetts.

University Hall's first floor contained the College Commons (dining room) until 1849. The building also contained a library and philosophical (scientific) apparatus, as well as a chapel within the second and third floors. A massive portico with stone pillars was added to the western facade soon after completion, but removed in 1842. In 1849 the first floor was partitioned into classrooms; in 1867 the chapel was partitioned as well. In 1896 the chapel was restored and used for meetings of the Faculty of Arts and Sciences. In 1924 Daniel Chester French's bronze statue of John Harvard was moved to the western façade from its original location near Memorial Hall.

1969 Occupation 

In protest of the Vietnam War and Harvard's connections to it, students occupied University Hall on the night of April 8 to 9, 1969, forcing out Harvard officials and staff. In the early morning hours of April 10 the occupiers were ejected and some 100 to 300 persons arrested; about 50 were injured.

See also
 List of National Historic Landmarks in Massachusetts
 National Register of Historic Places listings in Cambridge, Massachusetts

References

 William Garrott Brown, Official Guide to Harvard University, Harvard Memorial Society, 1899, page 23.
 Douglass Shand-Tucci, Harvard University: Campus Guide, Princeton Architectural Press, 2001, pages 22–23. .
 Bainbridge Bunting, Margaret Henderson Floyd, Harvard: An Architectural History, Harvard University Press, 1985. .
 Harvard Magazine article

School buildings completed in 1815
Harvard University buildings
National Historic Landmarks in Cambridge, Massachusetts
Charles Bulfinch buildings
Harvard Square
University and college buildings on the National Register of Historic Places in Massachusetts
Historic district contributing properties in Massachusetts
1815 establishments in Massachusetts
National Register of Historic Places in Cambridge, Massachusetts